Crossover Ministry is the third studio album by American crossover thrash band Iron Reagan, released in 2017 by Relapse Records. As with previous entries, many of its lyrics contain social and political commentary, with the title track, "Megachurch", and "Dogsnotgods" in particular targeting organized religion.

Recording and release
Crossover Ministry was recorded during the summer of 2016 at Blaze of Torment Studios in Richmond, Virginia and mixed by Kurt Ballou at GodCity Studio in Salem, Massachusetts. On November 16, 2016, the opening track, "A Dying World" was released as a single through SoundCloud, followed by "Grim Business" on December 12 and "Bleed the Fifth" on January 12. The full album was released by Relapse Records on February 3, 2017, on compact disc, LP, cassette, and via digital download and streaming.

Track listing

Personnel

Iron Reagan
Tony Foresta – vocals
Mark Bronzino – lead guitar
Phil Hall – rhythm guitar
Rob Skotis – bass
Ryan Parrish – drums

Guest vocalists
Dave Wood (on "No Sell")
Andreas Sandberg (on "Megachurch")
Marissa Paternoster (on "Eat or be Eaten")

Production
Produced by Phil Hall
Mixed by Kurt Ballou
Mastered by Brad Boatright
Cover design by Orion Landau
Artwork by David "Bonethrower" Cook

Charts

References

External links
Official website

2017 albums
Iron Reagan albums
Relapse Records albums